Pedredo is a town in the Arenas de Iguña municipality of the Spanish region of Cantabria. In the year 2004 its population was 239. There has been a parish church located in the center of Pedredo since the 17th century. The town is also the birthplace of the bell founder Pedro Buenaga Pernía (1917-2001).

References
Cantabria 102 Municipios 

Towns in Spain